The 2019 Tenerife Tournament (also known as United International Football Festival) is a scheduled association football that will take place in November 2019. Despite the name including Tenerife, this competition will take place on the neighbouring island Gran Canaria.

The competition is being used to prepare South American teams for the 2020 CONMEBOL Pre-Olympic Tournament.

Venues

Matches

Semi-finals

Third-place playoff

Final

References 

International association football competitions hosted by Spain
2019 in association football